Neo-opsis Science Fiction Magazine is a digest sized, perfect bound, Canadian magazine publishing science fiction and fantasy stories, science and opinion articles, SF news and reviews.  Neo-opsis is based in Victoria, British Columbia, Canada. It is distributed to book stores by Magazines Canada.

History
 Neo-opsis premiered at VCon 28 in Vancouver, BC, October 10–12, 2003.
 Neo-opsis began being distributed to Canadian bookstores by Magazines Canada. 2004.
 The Best of Neo-opsis was published by Bundoran Press in October, 2006. This included stories from the first 12 issues.
 Bonus CD-Roms "of Amazingly Neat Stuff" were included with issues 4, 8, 12, 16, 20, and 24.
 Neo-opsis went to digital format only starting with issue 31.

People

Karl Johanson
Editor: In addition to editing Neo-opsis], Karl is a writer, videographer, and computer game professional. Karl is a regular guest speaker at conventions, talking about science, science fiction, writing, publishing, gaming, sources of inspiration, and other topics.

Stephanie Ann Johanson
Assistant editor and Art Director: Stephanie Ann Johanson is an artist who works in a variety of media, sketching, pen & ink, oil and acrylic painting, soapstone carving, wire sculpture, and digital imagery to name just a few. Stephanie has been called a “science fiction activist”, because of her desire to encourage others to enjoy the genre.

Awards
 Neo-opsis Nominee 2004 Monday Magazine M Award. Best Magazine.
 Neo-opsis: Winner 2007 Aurora Award Best Work in English: Other.
 Neo-opsis: Winner 2009 Aurora Award Best Work in English: Other.
 Neo-opsis Nominee 2004, 2005, 2006, 2008, 2010, 2011, 2012 Aurora Award Best Work in English: Other.
 Neo-opsis Nominee 2020 Aurora Award Best Related Work.

Quotes
 "Neo-opsis is the thinking man and woman's magazine."—Sandra Scholes (Reviewer)
 "Congratulations on a great concept with Neo-opsis. With such a variety of contributing writers and ideas, it’s first-class."—Al Harlow (Guitarist, songwriter, and lead vocalist for Prism.)
 "Johanson's sense of humour, evident in both of his columns, is also conspicuously present in his pick for the issue's first story, "On The Road With Fiamong's Rule" by Sherry D. Ramsey. If I had to put a label to that sense of humour, I'd call it mainstream geek: two parts Jerry Lewis, one part Richard Feynman, a pinch of Firesign Theater and a twist of aggressive oddity." --Jeremy Lyon (Reviewer)
 "Congratulations on a really fine job. It reads good, looks good, feels good, smells good, and for all I know tastes good as well."—Spider Robinson (Writer)
 "It's a great little publication, worthy of your time."—Lorina Stephens (Writer Publisher)
 "I recently received the copy you sent of Neo-opsis and I was quite pleased. The stories were strikingly good, lots better than I'd expected for the first issue of a semi-pro zine."—Rich Horton (Reviewer for Locus magazine)

See also
 On Spec
 Science fiction magazine
 Fantasy fiction magazine
 Horror fiction magazine
 Aurora Awards

External links
  Neo-opsis Official Website
 Neo-opsis at the Internet Speculative Fiction Database

2003 establishments in Canada
Science fiction magazines established in the 2000s
Science fiction magazines published in Canada
Magazines established in 2003
Science fiction digests
Magazines published in British Columbia
Mass media in Victoria, British Columbia